German submarine U-275 was a Type VIIC U-boat of Nazi Germany's Kriegsmarine during World War II. The submarine was laid down on 18 January 1942 at the Bremer-Vulkan-Vegesacker Werft (yard) in Bremen as yard number 40. She was launched on 8 October 1942 and commissioned on 25 November under the command of Oberleutnant zur See Helmut Bork.

She was a member of four wolfpacks.

She was sunk by a mine in the English Channel on 10 March 1945.

Design
German Type VIIC submarines were preceded by the shorter Type VIIB submarines. U-275 had a displacement of  when at the surface and  while submerged. She had two shafts and two  propellers.

U-275 was fitted with five  torpedo tubes (four fitted at the bow and one at the stern), fourteen torpedoes, one  SK C/35 naval gun, 220 rounds, and two twin  C/30 anti-aircraft guns. The boat had a complement of between forty-four and sixty.

Service history
After training with the 8th U-boat Flotilla, the boat became operational on 1 June 1943 when she was transferred to the 3rd flotilla. 
U-275 carried out a series of short voyages between Kiel in Germany and Bergen and Trondheim in Norway in August 1943.

First patrol
The boat's first patrol proper began when she departed Bergen on 4 September 1943. She entered the Atlantic Ocean after negotiating the gap between Iceland and the Faroe Islands. She was unsuccessfully attacked by a Lockheed Hudson southwest of Iceland. She reached La Pallice in occupied France on 28 October.

Second patrol
The boat's second foray was divided into a series of short bursts between La Pallice and Brest between November 1943 and April 1944.

Another moment of drama came when the submarine was obliged to return to base on 3 January with the captain suffering from appendicitis.

Third and fourth patrols
Patrol number three was similarly short, starting and finishing in Brest on 20 and 23 May 1944.

Not long after D-Day (6 June 1944) on her fourth sortie, having been identified by Cryptanalysis of the Enigma intercepts, which was confirmed with a solo photographic reconnaissance Spitfire from No. 541 Squadron RAF, she was attacked by no less than eight Hawker Typhoon strike attack aircraft of No. 263 Squadron RAF while tied up in Saint Peter Port Harbour, Guernsey on 14 June. No damage was caused to the submarine; escorting vessels were not so lucky.

Fifth patrol
While negotiating the relatively shallow waters of the English Channel, the submarine was discovered by an aircraft which vectored a hunter-killer group onto her. She then spent seven hours being chased before she shook off her pursuers.

The situation had become so dire that the boat was chased every time she raised her periscope. She eventually reached comparative safety in Boulogne on 2 August 1944.

U-275 reached Boulogne in the night from 31 Juli on 1 August 1944.

Sixth patrol
It was decided to send U-275 back to Norwegian waters. She sailed westward, the 'long' way around the British Isles. She had almost reached Bergen on 18 September 1944, when she was attacked by a total of eight De Havilland Mosquitos. Two were armed with the Tse tse 6-pounder cannon, four more were equipped with depth charges, (they were all from 248 Squadron), while the last two, from 235 Squadron, were there as escorts.

She was strafed and bombed while half submerged. However, luck was on the U-boat's side; one cannon jammed and two bombs failed to release. A coastal battery also fired on the British aircraft, causing them to leave the scene of the attack. The U-boat, having suffered some damage, then made her way to her destination.

Seventh and eighth patrols
These two patrols were relatively trouble-free, but the boat did return to the French Atlantic coast, docking at St. Nazaire on 10 February 1945.

Ninth patrol and loss
Having departed St. Nazaire on 25 February 1945, she headed for the English Channel once more. On 8 March she sank the Lornaston northwest of Fécamp. On the tenth, she struck a mine off Beachy Head and sank.

Forty-eight men died; there were no survivors.

Wolfpacks
U-275 took part in four wolfpacks, namely:
 Leuthen (15 – 24 September 1943)
 Rossbach (24 September – 9 October 1943)
 Borkum (18 December 1943 – 3 January 1944)
 Dragoner (21 – 22 May 1944)

Summary of raiding history

References

Notes

Citations

Bibliography

External links

World War II submarines of Germany
German Type VIIC submarines
U-boats commissioned in 1942
1942 ships
Ships built in Bremen (state)
U-boats sunk by mines
Ships lost with all hands
U-boats sunk in 1945
World War II shipwrecks in the English Channel
Maritime incidents in March 1945